Agapeta angelana is a species of moth of the family Tortricidae. It is found in Spain.

The wingspan is 23–25 mm. Adults have been recorded on wing from June to August.

References

External links

Lepiforum.de

Moths described in 1919
Cochylini
Moths of Europe